Melattur railway station is a minor railway station serving the town of Melattur in the Malappuram district of Kerala. It lies on scenic Nilambur–Shoranur line of Palakkad Division of Southern Railways. Trains halting at the station connect the town to prominent cities in Kerala such as Nilambur, Shoranur, Palakkad, Ernakulam and Thiruvananthapuram.

Shoranur–Nilambur railway line
The Nilambur–Shoranur line is a branch line of the Southern Railway zone in Kerala state and one of the shortest broad-gauge railway lines in India. It is a single line with  length running from Shoranur Junction (in Palakkad district) to Nilambur railway station (in Malappuram district).  This station is 4 km from the town of Nilambur on the Kozhikode–Ooty highway. Shoranur–Nilambur Road passenger trains are running on this route.

References

Railway stations in Malappuram district
Nilambur–Shoranur railway line